The 1989–90 Whitbread Round the World Race was run from Southampton to Southampton in 1989–90. It was run with several classes of yacht.

Steinlager 2 skippered by Peter Blake won the race easily. For the first time since 1981–82 (when the race comprised just four legs), the victor won every leg in their division (albeit closely chased by both Grant Dalton's Fisher & Paykel NZ and Pierre Fehlmann's Merit entries). The vast difference in speed and capability of the many different boats involved in the 1989 to 1990 race lead to the creation of a committee to examine the commission of a Whitbread class boat for use in future races. Many of the Maxi yachts in this year's race were nearly twice the size (LOA) of the smallest, and carried well over twice the sail area. The net result of this was that many of the smaller boats finished the longer legs more than ten days after the leg winner. In the overall results, the last finisher was some 52 days behind Blake's Steinlager 2 128-day aggregate time. In addition, the cost of the big yachts was becoming too expensive to fund - even for the well sponsored teams like Steinlager, Rothmans and Merit. Eventually, the new class would be called the Whitbread 60.

The race featured the first all-woman crew on Tracy Edwards' Maiden. Although in a much smaller boat than many of their male counterparts the women fared well—claiming two leg victories in Division D. Edwards was named yachtsman of the year and appointed MBE. In 2018 a documentary has been made about the team's participation in the race.

Route

Results 

The boat Creighton's Naturally suffered a serious broach on leg 2, at about 3 am. Crew members Anthony (Tony) Philips and Bart van den Dwey were swept over board. They were both pulled back on deck. Van den Dwey successfully resuscitated, but, after three hours of trying, crewmembers were unable to revive Philips. A few days later, by radio agreement with relatives ashore, Philips was buried at sea.

Martela OF lost its keel and capsized 350 nautical miles from the finish of leg 4. The unharmed crew was picked up from the overturned hull by Charles Jourdan and Merit. Union Bank of Finland also broke off the race to participate in the rescue.

References

The Ocean Race
Punta del Este
Sports competitions in Southampton
Fremantle
History of Fort Lauderdale, Florida
Sports in Fort Lauderdale, Florida
Whitbread Round The World Race, 1989-90
Whitbread Round The World Race, 1989-90
Sports competitions in Auckland
1990 in New Zealand sport
1980s in Auckland
1980s in Southampton
1990s in Auckland
1990s in Southampton